Thomas Lawrence Sansonetti (born May 18, 1949), is an attorney and a former government official from the U.S. state of Wyoming.  He now resides in Greenwood Village, a suburb of Denver, Colorado.

After graduation from high school, he earned an M.B.A. from the University of Virginia in Charlottesville and his Juris Doctor from Washington and Lee University School of Law in Lexington, Virginia. From 1983 to 1987, Sansonetti served as Chair of the Wyoming Republican Party. In 1989, he became legislative director for newly elected U.S. Representative Craig L. Thomas, and shortly afterwards was chosen to be his chief of staff. In 1991, he became Solicitor of the U.S. Department of the Interior, where he served until 1993.  He then joined the Cheyenne law firm of Holland and Hart, where he worked until being appointed Assistant U.S. Attorney General for the Environment and Natural Resources Division of the Justice Department. He is considered to be a strong conservative but has never held elective office.

Sansonetti received the most votes from the GOP central committee to succeed his former mentor, Senator Thomas, who died on June 4, 2007. He advanced as one of the state GOP's three party nominees for senator. Governor Dave Freudenthal appointed State Senator John Barrasso, an orthopedic surgeon from Casper.

References

1949 births
20th-century American lawyers
20th-century American politicians
21st-century American lawyers
21st-century American politicians
George W. Bush administration personnel
George H. W. Bush administration personnel
Lawyers from Denver
Living people
People from Campbell County, Wyoming
People from Hinsdale, Illinois
Place of birth missing (living people)
Political chiefs of staff
Politicians from Cheyenne, Wyoming
Solicitors of the United States Department of the Interior
State political party chairs of Wyoming
United States Assistant Attorneys General for the Environment and Natural Resources Division
United States congressional aides
University of Virginia alumni
Washington and Lee University School of Law alumni
Wyoming lawyers
Wyoming Republicans